In Israel, the Jerusalem metropolitan area is the area encompassing the approximately one hundred square miles surrounding the Old City of Jerusalem with a population of 1,253,900. The expansion of Jerusalem under Israeli law followed its official annexation of the city in the aftermath of the 1967 Six-Day War. Greater Jerusalem is divided into three areas: the outer ring, the New City/Center, and The Historical Center/Inner Ring.
The rings are mainly used as an administrative tool to incorporate, public transit, housing, and utility services under a common structure.
Greater Jerusalem can be said to encompass the entire City of Jerusalem (both its Western and Eastern parts) and its suburbs. It is the second largest metropolitan area in Israel, behind Gush Dan.

Metropolitan Rings 

Notes
1. The population of "Jews and others" incl. Jews, non-Arab Christians and those not classified by religion.
2. Includes the city of Jerusalem.
3. Includes the cities Bet Shemesh, Maale Adumim, Mevasseret Zion, as well as many smaller towns (local councils). It does not include nearby Arab communities in Judea and Samaria/the West Bank, such as Ramallah, El Bireh, Bethlehem, Abu Dis, or Al-Eizariya.

See also

Old City (Jerusalem)
West Jerusalem
East Jerusalem
Jerusalem District
City Line (Jerusalem)
Green Line (Israel)
Positions on Jerusalem

References

Geography of Jerusalem District
Metropolitan areas of Israel